Death By Gossip with Wendy Williams is an American documentary television series on Investigation Discovery which premiered on September 4, 2015. Announced in March 2015, the series features crime stories which are initiated by gossip and subsequently became motive for unfaithfulness or even murder. The documentary series is presented by talk show host Wendy Williams.

"Everyone loves a little dish now and then, but in these cases, guilty pleasure can become motive for murder," said Williams, who also acts as an executive producer. "I’m an ID Addict and I dare anyone not to be intrigued by the real-life stories we tell every week," she also added.

Episodes

References

External links 

 
 

2015 American television series debuts
2015 American television series endings
2010s American reality television series
2010s American documentary television series
Investigation Discovery original programming
English-language television shows